George Garden may refer to:
 George Garden (politician)
 George Garden (minister)